Nicolas Bergeron is a French mathematician born on 19 December 1975, who works in Pierre and Marie Curie University in Paris. He is the managing editor of the journal Publications Mathématiques de l'IHÉS.

Early career  
Bergeron obtained his PhD at École normale supérieure de Lyon in the year 2000 under the supervision of Jean-Pierre Otal. His thesis was titled Cycles géodésiques dans les variétés hyperboliques ("geodesic cycles in hyperbolic varieties").

Work 
Bergeron's main interests are concerned with the geometry and topology of locally symmetric spaces and arithmetic groups, as well as their cohomology.

Some of his publications show an interest in Oulipo, referencing An Attempt at Exhausting a Place in Paris by Georges Perec. He has also written a (non-mathematical) article about Jacques Roubaud.

He is currently the editor-in-chief of the journal Publications Mathématiques de l'IHÉS.

Publications 
 
 
 
 Nicolas Bourbaki Seminar 2013–2014 no. 1078 Toute variété de dimension 3 compacte et asphérique est virtuellement de Haken ("Every 3-Dimensional Compact Ashperical Variety is Virtually Haken") (following Ian Agol, Daniel Wise)

 He edited a few articles for the site Images des mathématiques du CNRS.
 Comprendre les espaces de dimension 3 dans La Recherche n°496 (February 2015) page 54.
 Le spectre des surfaces hyperboliques ("The Spectrum of Hyperbolic Surfaces") (EDP Sciences - Collection : Savoirs Actuels - September 2011)

 With 14 co-authors, Uniformisation des surfaces de Riemann ("Uniformization of Riemann Surfaces").

Awards and Prizes
 He won the Médaille de bronze du CNRS in 2007

 He was a junior member of Institut Universitaire de France from 2010 until  2015

 He was an invited speaker at the 2018 International congress of mathematicians in Rio with a talk on "Hodge theory and cycle theory of locally symmetric spaces"

References

External links 
 CV and Publication List

20th-century French mathematicians

1975 births
Living people
Academic staff of Pierre and Marie Curie University
ENS Fontenay-Saint-Cloud-Lyon alumni
Mathematics journal editors
21st-century French mathematicians